Ultramarine is the fourth studio album by Young Galaxy, released in April 2013. As with their previous album, it was produced by Dan Lissvik and was released on Paper Bag Records.

The album was named a longlisted nominee for the 2013 Polaris Music Prize on June 13, 2013, and named to the short list on July 16, 2013.

Track listing

References

2013 albums
Young Galaxy albums
Paper Bag Records albums